Provincial Road 241 (PR 241) is a short provincial road in Manitoba, Canada.  It begins at Winnipeg's Perimeter Highway (PTH 100) and runs east into the Rural Municipality of Headingley, ending at PR 334 south (Harris Road).

PR 241 is a western extension of Roblin Boulevard running along the south side of the Assiniboine River, used mostly by local residents and as an alternate to Portage Avenue (PTH 1) between Winnipeg and Headingley.  PR 241 formerly extended westward to Lido Plage Road (former PR 424) in the Rural Municipality of Cartier.  This section was decommissioned in 2013 and is now a municipal road, although still named Roblin Boulevard.

External links
Official Manitoba Highway Map
PR 241 at Curtiswalker.com

References

241